Apisa subargentea is a moth of the family Erebidae. It was described by James John Joicey and George Talbot in 1921. It is found in Burundi, the Democratic Republic of the Congo, Kenya and Rwanda.

References

Moths described in 1921
Syntomini
Erebid moths of Africa